Milena Zupančič (born 18 December 1946) is a Slovenian actress.

Biography
Raised by a single mother, Zupančič finished high school in her hometown of Jesenice. Her first major appearances were two roles in films by Matjaž Klopčič, in Blossoms in Autumn (Cvetje v jeseni; 1973) and The Widowhood of Karolina Žašler (1976).

She went on to star in a number of important film and television productions over the next four decades, winning two Golden Arena for Best Actress awards (in 1976 and 1977) and the Prešeren Award for Lifetime Achievement (1993). She is also known for starring in many theatre productions staged by the Ljubljana National Drama Theatre.

From 2000 to 2011 she was UNICEF regional ambassador for the Western Balkans. Zupančič is married to theatre director Dušan Jovanović, and was previously married to actor Radko Polič.

Selected filmography
Blossoms in Autumn (1973)
The Widowhood of Karolina Zasler (Vdovstvo Karoline Žašler, 1976)
Idealist (1976)
Journalist (Novinar, 1979)
Maya and the Starboy (1988)

References

External links
 

1946 births
Living people
Slovenian stage actresses
Yugoslav actresses
Golden Arena winners
People from Jesenice, Jesenice
Slovenian television actresses
Slovenian film actresses
20th-century Slovenian actresses
UNICEF Goodwill Ambassadors